Cold Spring Creek is a river in Delaware County, New York. It drains Clarks Pond and flows south before converging with the West Branch Delaware River in Stilesville.

References

Rivers of New York (state)
Rivers of Delaware County, New York
Tributaries of the West Branch Delaware River